This is a list of the extreme points of the United Kingdom: the points that are farther north, south, east or west than any other location. Traditionally the extent of the island of Great Britain has stretched "from Land's End to John o' Groats" (that is, from the extreme southwest of mainland England to the far northeast of mainland Scotland).

This article does not include references to the Channel Islands because they are Crown dependencies, not constituent parts of the United Kingdom.

Extreme points of the United Kingdom
 Northernmost point – Out Stack, Shetland at 
 Northernmost settlement – Skaw, Unst, Shetland Islands at 
 Southernmost point – Pednathise Head, Western Rocks, Isles of Scilly at 
 Southernmost settlement – St Agnes, Isles of Scilly at 
Until 1930, the westernmost settlement was Hirta, on the island of St Kilda, but it is now abandoned; the island now has a military base, staffed during the summer months.
 Easternmost point – Lowestoft Ness, Suffolk, at 
 Easternmost settlement – Lowestoft, Suffolk, at 
 Highest point – Ben Nevis, Scotland, at  

Extreme points within the UK
In addition to the extreme points of the UK as a whole, the extreme points of England, Northern Ireland, Scotland, Wales and for the island of Great Britain are listed below.

Great Britain
 Northernmost settlement – Skarfskerry, Caithness, Highland, Scotland at 
 Southernmost point – Lizard Point, Cornwall at 
 Southernmost settlement – Lizard, Cornwall, England at 
 Westernmost point – Corrachadh Mòr, Highland at 
 Westernmost settlement – Grigadale, Highland at 
 Easternmost point – Ness Point, Lowestoft, Suffolk at 
 Easternmost settlement – Lowestoft, Suffolk at 
 Furthest point from coastal waters - Church Flatts Farm, Coton-in-the-Elms, South Derbyshire at

England

Including islands
 Northernmost point – Marshall Meadows Bay, Northumberland at 
 Northernmost settlement – Marshall Meadows, Northumberland at 
 Southernmost point – Pednathise Head, Western Rocks, Isles of Scilly at 
 Southernmost settlement – St Agnes, Isles of Scilly at 
 Westernmost point – Crim Rocks, Isles of Scilly at 
 Westernmost settlement – Bryher, Isles of Scilly at 
 Easternmost point – Lowestoft Ness, Suffolk at 
 Easternmost settlement – Lowestoft, Suffolk at

English mainland
 Northernmost point – Marshall Meadows Bay, Northumberland at 
 Northernmost settlement – Marshall Meadows, Northumberland at 
 Southernmost point – Lizard Point, Cornwall at 
 Southernmost settlement – Lizard, Cornwall at 
 Westernmost point – Dr Syntax's Head, Land's End, Cornwall at 
 Westernmost settlement – Sennen Cove, Cornwall at 
 Easternmost point – Lowestoft Ness, Suffolk at 
 Easternmost settlement – Lowestoft, Suffolk at 
 Geographic centre of England - Lindley Hall Farm (#4), Leicestershire (near Fenny Drayton and Higham on the Hill) (

The distance between the southernmost point (Lizard Point) and the westernmost point (Land's End) is only .

Northern Ireland

Including islands
 Northernmost point – Skerriagh, Ballygill North, Rathlin Island, County Antrim at 
 Northernmost settlement – Rathlin Island, off Ballycastle Bay, County Antrim at 
 Southernmost point – Cranfield Point, County Down at 
 Southernmost settlement – Greencastle, County Down at 
 Westernmost point – western part of Manger townland, County Fermanagh (immediately east of the Bradogue Bridge) at 
 Westernmost settlement – Belleek, County Fermanagh at 
 Easternmost point – Cannon Rock, off Ards Peninsula, County Down at 
 Easternmost settlement – Portavogie, County Down at

Northern Irish mainland
 Northernmost point – Benbane Head, County Antrim at 
 Northernmost settlement – Ballintoy, County Antrim at 
 Southernmost point – Cranfield Point, County Down at 
 Southernmost settlement – Greencastle, County Down at 
 Westernmost point – western part of Manger townland, County Fermanagh (immediately east of the Bradogue Bridge) at 
 Westernmost settlement – Belleek, County Fermanagh at 
 Easternmost point – Burr Point, Ards Peninsula, County Down at 
 Easternmost settlement – Portavogie, County Down at

Scotland

Including islands
 Northernmost point – Out Stack, Shetland at 
 Northernmost settlement – Skaw, Unst, Shetland at 
 Southernmost point – Mull of Galloway, Wigtownshire at 
 Southernmost settlement – Cairngaan, Wigtownshire at 
 Westernmost point – Rockall at 
 Westernmost settlement – Caolas, Bhatarsaigh (Vatersay), Outer Hebrides at 
 Easternmost point – Bound Skerry, Out Skerries, Shetland at 
 Easternmost settlement – Bruray, Out Skerries, Shetland at

Scottish mainland
 Northernmost settlement – Skarfskerry, Caithness, Highland, Scotland at 
 Southernmost point – Mull of Galloway, Wigtownshire at 
 Southernmost settlement – Cairngaan, Wigtownshire at 
 Westernmost point – Corrachadh Mòr, Highland at 
 Westernmost settlement – Grigadale, Highland at 
 Easternmost point – Keith Inch, Aberdeenshire at 
 Easternmost settlement – Peterhead, Aberdeenshire at

Wales

Including islands
 Northernmost point – Middle Mouse, Anglesey at 
 Northernmost settlement – Llanlleiana, Anglesey at 
 Southernmost point – Flat Holm, Cardiff, off Lavernock Point, Vale of Glamorgan at 
 Southernmost settlement – Rhoose, Vale of Glamorgan at 
 Westernmost point – Grassholm, Pembrokeshire at 
 Westernmost settlement – Treginnis, Pembrokeshire at 
 Easternmost point – Lady Park Wood, near Monmouth, Monmouthshire at 
 Easternmost settlement – Chepstow, Monmouthshire at

Welsh mainland
 Northernmost point – Point of Ayr, Flintshire at 
 Northernmost settlement – Talacre, Flintshire at 
 Southernmost point – Breaksea Point, Vale of Glamorgan at 
 Southernmost settlement – Rhoose, Vale of Glamorgan at 
 Westernmost point – Pen Dal-aderyn, Pembrokeshire at 
 Westernmost settlement – Treginnis, Pembrokeshire at 
 Easternmost point – Lady Park Wood, near Monmouth, Monmouthshire at 
 Easternmost settlement – Chepstow, Monmouthshire at

British Overseas Territories and Crown dependencies
 Northernmost – Point of Ayre, Isle of Man at 
 Southernmost – South Pole, British Antarctic Territory at  – disputed
 Southernmost – Thule Island, South Sandwich Islands at  – if not including Antarctica
 Westernmost – Oeno Island, Pitcairn Islands at 
 Easternmost – Diego Garcia, British Indian Ocean Territory at  – disputed
 Easternmost - Ayios Nikolaos Station, Dhekelia Cantonment in Cyprus at  - if not including BIOT

See also 
 Centre points of the United Kingdom
 Geography of the United Kingdom
 List of mountains and hills of the United Kingdom
 Extreme points of the British Isles
Extreme points of Ireland
 Extreme points of the European Union
 Extreme points of Europe
 Extreme points of Eurasia
 Extreme points of Africa-Eurasia
 Extreme points of Earth

References

United Kingdom
Extreme points